Dongola is a village in Union County, Illinois, United States. The population was 726 at the 2010 census.

History
Dongola was laid out in 1857 as a stop along the Illinois Central Railroad. A post office known as "Unionville" had been established in 1855, but the name was changed to "Dongola," after Dongola, Sudan.

Geography
Dongola is located at  (37.361243, -89.164574).  The village is situated north of Cairo at the intersection of Old U.S. Highway 51 (signed as Front Street in Dongola) and Interstate 57.  The point at which Union, Pulaski, and Alexander counties meet is located just to the southwest.  Dongola Lake, created by a small dam along Little Creek, lies to the west of Dongola.

Demographics

As of the census of 2000, there were 806 people, 330 households, and 222 families residing in the village. The racial makeup of the village was 95.78% White, 0.12% African American, 0.87% Native American, 0.37% Asian, 0.12% from other races, and 2.73% from two or more races. Hispanic or Latino of any race were 0.12% of the population.

There were 330 households, out of which 33.0% had children under the age of 18 living with them, 48.5% were married couples living together, 15.8% had a female householder with no husband present, and 32.7% were non-families. 30.6% of all households were made up of individuals, and 13.9% had someone living alone who was 65 years of age or older. The average household size was 2.39 and the average family size was 2.96.

In the village, the population was spread out, with 27.5% under the age of 18, 8.2% from 18 to 24, 27.8% from 25 to 44, 19.9% from 45 to 64, and 16.6% who were 65 years of age or older. The median age was 35 years. For every 100 females, there were 87.9 males. For every 100 females age 18 and over, there were 81.4 males.

The median income for a household in the village was $24,539, and the median income for a family was $32,115. Males had a median income of $30,234 versus $18,864 for females. The per capita income for the village was $11,917. About 15.2% of families and 21.5% of the population were below the poverty line, including 29.1% of those under age 18 and 9.1% of those age 65 or over.

References

External links

Villages in Union County, Illinois
Villages in Illinois